Science in popular culture is the treatment and use of scientific themes and issues in popular media such as cinema, music, television and novels. Science fiction (SciFi), in particular, is the branch of literature which uses scientific ideas as a basis.  In such works, the science used is sometimes distorted in order to fit the content.

History 

Before the 19th century, new discoveries or developments in science did not uniformly influence society.  The average farmer would have no knowledge of a new surgical technique or newly discovered element, and even if they did know about it, they may not understand all the research and mechanisms of it.  As industrialization and urbanization rose, people began leaving their lives working at large factories, which had a negative impact on traditional beliefs.  The new scientific knowledge was challenging traditional beliefs and bringing up new questions that were never thought of before, and that intrigued the public.  One still argued example is the idea of evolution.  Even though it had provided somewhat of an answer of where did we come from, it also went against what the church said, and thus became controversial. People started to learn about new ideas and ways of thinking while being exposed to new kinds of people while working.

There was a shift, beginning in the 19th century, of scientific and technological knowledge being inserted into people's everyday lives.  This was due to knowledge becoming more appealing and accepted by entrepreneurs, who would then publicize those ideas to the public. One example is the development of the lobotomy, and how even it was considered as a medical procedure. It was mocked by many doctors and was seen as controversial within the scientific community. The main reason it was so popular to the public was because it was better than the alternative treatment for mental illnesses such as schizophrenia, depression, compulsive disorders, and many more.  As the scientific discoveries improved peoples' lives, it became a more active participant in society to help solve some of humanity's problems.

By the mid-19th century, knowledge became more specialized and institutionalized where only those that had spent years studying a topic could fully grasp the theories.  As more was discovered within a given field, the more those trying to discover something new had to delve further into a specific field.  For example, during the beginning of biological research scientists wanted to understand how animals were related, by creating trees of life to show how they believe each animal is related to one another, this was typically done based on the animal's traits.  Now scientists have to focus microscopically to discover something new, like DNA sequences or a new protein that is involved in the complex functions of life. An emphasis in classification encourage scientists to concentrate in a single field. As scientists went deeper into their field, the separation between fields to the point that two scientists from different areas of study wouldn’t be able to discuss their respective discoveries to one another.  This specialization also discouraged average citizens with no specific background in the field from learning about it.  Due to the gap between the public and scientific discoveries, people began viewing some of the scientific discoveries as irrelevant since they could neither understand it or see it within their community or lives. For instance, the average person on the street wouldn't know anything about a recently discovered protein, but might know about the stock market trends.

Popular science, which is a more simplified and vague version of a given scientific topic, was developed to combat the specificity of the sciences. Usually in the form of written media at the time, this allowed scientific ideas to be presented to the public in a way they could understand it.  It became very popular with the public as it made science seem as though it had no boundaries, that anything was possible.  From popular science stemmed science fiction, which was constructed from a blend of observations and fantasy and didn’t need consistency, since it was not truly real.   It substituted science for magic since the audience didn’t necessarily need to know how it did what it did, but rather what it did do. It allowed for imagination to collide with science to form fantasy.  Popular response of the sciences continues to be a combination of support and distrust depending on the topic.

Examples

Alternative worlds 
Fictional worlds are worlds inhabited by fictional characters.  They may be a mirror of the real world with some other-worldly traits, like in The Wizard of Oz, or can be a fictional version of our world in the past, like The Lord of the Rings trilogy.  It can also be like the real world but with an alternate history, as in the Eden trilogy by Harry Harrison, where the dinosaurs were never wiped out.

Androids 

The focus of these is the invention and use of robots that look and act like humans.  Today there has been development of some prototype androids, like Sophia that was created by Hanson Robotics, who can interact with humans and engage in sophisticated but limited movement.

See also

References